Getachew Jigi Demekssa (born 4 December 1967) is an Ethiopian politician. He was a Representative from the State of Oromia in the House of Peoples' Representatives 2005–2009, and a member of the Oromo Federalist Democratic Movement party.

Works
 Bu'aa ba'ii qabsoo uummata Oromoo : sirna gabrummaa irraa gara bilisummaatti (2014)

References

External links
 Ethiopian MP calls for intl probe on human rights situation in Oromia, Press release 12 April 2007

Oromo people
Members of the House of Peoples' Representatives
Living people
1967 births